Beerli is a Swiss surname. Notable people with the surname include:

  (born 1953), Swiss politician
 Roland Beerli, Swiss bobsledder
 Joseph Beerli (1901–1967), Swiss bobsledder

Swiss-German surnames